Cephenemyia pratti is a species of nose bot flies in the family Oestridae.

References

Oestridae
Articles created by Qbugbot
Insects described in 1916